From Seed to $ale is a solo album by American rapper Berner. It was released on October 27, 2022, via Bern One Entertainment/Empire. It features guest appearances from Cozmo, Seddy Hendrinx, CJ Washington, Hollywood, JMSN, Mozzy, The Jacka and Wiz Khalifa. The album peaked at number 20 on the Billboard 200.

Track listing

Charts

References

External links

2022 albums
Berner (rapper) albums
Hip hop albums by American artists